Hakeem Muata Oluseyi (born James Edward Plummer, Jr.; March 13, 1967) is an American astrophysicist, cosmologist, inventor, educator, science communicator, author, actor, veteran, and humanitarian.

Early life and education
Oluseyi was born James Edward Plummer, Jr. in New Orleans, Louisiana. After his parents divorced when he was four years old, he and his mother moved to a different state along the southern border of the US every year. He lived in some of the country's toughest neighborhoods including the 9th Ward of New Orleans; Watts, Los Angeles, California; Inglewood, California; South Park, Houston, Texas; and Third Ward, Houston, Texas before settling in rural Mississippi a month before Oluseyi turned 13 years old. He completed middle school and high school in the East Jasper School District graduating as his high school's valedictorian in 1985. Oluseyi served in the U.S. Navy from 1984 to 1986. He credits the Navy with teaching him algebra.

After leaving the Navy with an honorable discharge due to a skin condition from which he had suffered since he was a child, Oluseyi enrolled in Tougaloo College where he earned Bachelor of Science degrees in physics and mathematics. In 1991, he became a graduate student at Stanford University.
He earned an M.S. degree in physics in 1995. He changed his name to Hakeem ("wise" in Arabic) Muata ("he who speaks the truth" in Swahili) Oluseyi ("God has done this" in Yoruba) in 1996. 
Oluseyi earned his Ph.D. degree in physics from Stanford in 1999 under the mentorship of Arthur B. C. Walker Jr., from whom he learned experimental space research. Under Walker's tutelage, Oluseyi helped to design, build, calibrate, and launch the Multi-Spectral Solar Telescope Array (MSSTA), which pioneered normal incidence extreme ultraviolet and soft x-ray imaging of the Sun's transition region and corona. Oluseyi is a member of Kappa Alpha Psi.

Career
From 1999 to 2001 he worked on semiconductor research at Applied Materials.
From 2001 to 2004 he was a research fellow at Lawrence Berkeley National Laboratory, working on the Dark Energy Camera and Vera C. Rubin Observatory.

From 2007 to 2019, he was on the faculty of the Florida Institute of Technology in the departments of Physics and Space Sciences. His academic rank was distinguished research professor. 
From 2016 to 2019. he was stationed at NASA Headquarters in Washington DC where he was the Space Sciences education manager for NASA's Science Mission Directorate via the Intergovernmental Personnel Act Mobility Program. Oluseyi was named a Visiting Robinson Professor at George Mason University in 2021, a distinction by which the university recognizes outstanding faculty.

In 2021, he published an autobiography titled: A Quantum Life: My Unlikely Journey from the Street to the Stars co-authored with Joshua Horwitz. As of 2022, Oluseyi is the president of the National Society of Black Physicists.

His best known scientific contributions are research on the transfer of mass and energy through the Sun's atmosphere; the development of space-borne observatories for studying astrophysical plasmas and dark energy; and the development of transformative technologies in ultraviolet optics, detectors, computer chips, and ion propulsion.

In 2021, Oluseyi carried out an investigation into the role that former NASA administrator James Webb played in the Lavender Scare of the 1950s and 1960s, after a number of scientists and journalists had raised concerns about the naming of NASA's new space telescope after him. Contrary to the claims of Webb's critics, Oluseyi found there was no evidence that Webb was implicated. His finding was later confirmed by a full report carried out by NASA itself.

In popular culture
Oluseyi appears as a commentator and scientific authority on Science Channel television shows including How the Universe Works, Outrageous Acts of Science, Curiosity, NASA's Unexplained Files, Space's Deepest Secrets, and Strip the Cosmos,. He also appeared as a 'bakineering' (baking and engineering) judge on Netflix's Baking Impossible.
He appeared on the National Geographic Channel show Evacuate Earth.

He contributed science articles to the news media, including The Washington Post. He lent his voice and scientific expertise to the award-winning science education video game ExoTrex: A Space Science Adventure Game in collaboration with Dig-It! Games.

He co-authored the children's popular science book Discovery Spaceopedia: The Complete Guide to Everything Space.

Family 
Oluseyi met his wife, Jessica, at Tougaloo College. They have a daughter and a son. Oluseyi has a son from an earlier relationship.

References 

Living people
American astrophysicists
Tougaloo College alumni
Stanford University alumni
Florida Institute of Technology faculty
United States Navy sailors
1967 births
Scientists from New Orleans
20th-century American astronomers
20th-century African-American scientists
21st-century American astronomers
21st-century African-American scientists
African-American United States Navy personnel